The Seven Basic Plots: Why We Tell Stories is a 2004 book by Christopher Booker containing a Jung-influenced analysis of stories and their psychological meaning. Booker worked on the book for 34 years.

Summary

The meta-plot
The meta-plot begins with the anticipation stage, in which the hero is called to the adventure to come. This is followed by a dream stage, in which the adventure begins, the hero has some success, and has an illusion of invincibility. However, this is then followed by a frustration stage, in which the hero has his first confrontation with the enemy, and the illusion of invincibility is lost. This worsens in the nightmare stage, which is the climax of the plot, where hope is apparently lost. Finally, in the resolution, the hero overcomes his burden against the odds.

The key thesis of the book: "However many characters may appear in a story, its real concern is with just one: its hero. It is the one whose fate we identify with, as we see them gradually developing towards that state of self-realization which marks the end of the story.  Ultimately it is in relation to this central figure that all other characters in a story take on their significance. What each of the other characters represents is really only some aspect of the inner state of the hero himself."

The plots

Overcoming the monster
Definition: The protagonist sets out to defeat an antagonistic force (often evil) that threatens the protagonist and/or protagonist's homeland.

Examples: Perseus, Theseus, Beowulf, Dracula, The War of the Worlds, Nicholas Nickleby, The Guns of Navarone, Seven Samurai (The Magnificent Seven), James Bond, Jaws, Star Wars, Naruto.

Rags to riches
Definition: The poor protagonist acquires power, wealth, and/or a mate, loses it all and gains it back, growing as a person as a result.

Examples: Cinderella, Aladdin, Jane Eyre, A Little Princess, Great Expectations, David Copperfield, Moll Flanders, The Red and the Black, The Prince and the Pauper, The Ugly Duckling, The Gold Rush, The Jerk.

The quest
Definition: The protagonist and companions set out to acquire an important object or to get to a location. They face temptations and other obstacles along the way. 

Examples: The Iliad, The Pilgrim's Progress, The Lord of the Rings, King Solomon's Mines, The Divine Comedy, Watership Down, The Aeneid, Raiders of the Lost Ark, Monty Python and the Holy Grail.

Voyage and return
Definition: The protagonist goes to a strange land and, after overcoming the threats it poses or learning important lessons unique to that location, returns with experience.

Examples:  Ramayana, Odyssey, Alice's Adventures in Wonderland, Goldilocks and the Three Bears, Orpheus, The Time Machine, Peter Rabbit, The Hobbit,  Brideshead Revisited, The Rime of the Ancient Mariner, Gone with the Wind, The Third Man, The Lion King, Back to the Future, The Lion, the Witch and the Wardrobe, Gulliver's Travels, Peter Pan, The Epic of Gilgamesh.

Comedy 
Definition: Light and humorous character with a happy or cheerful ending; a dramatic work in which the central motif is the triumph over adverse circumstance, resulting in a successful or happy conclusion.
Booker stresses that comedy is more than humor. It refers to a pattern where the conflict becomes more and more confusing, but is at last made plain in a single clarifying event. The majority of romance films fall into this category.

Examples: The Wasps, Aurularia, The Arbitration, A Midsummer Night's Dream, Much Ado About Nothing, Twelfth Night, The Taming of the Shrew, The Alchemist, Bridget Jones's Diary, Four Weddings and a Funeral, The Big Lebowski.

Tragedy
Definition: The protagonist is a hero with a major character flaw or great mistake which is ultimately their undoing. Their unfortunate end evokes pity at their folly and the fall of a fundamentally good character.

Examples: Anna Karenina, Bonnie and Clyde, Carmen, Citizen Kane, John Dillinger, Jules et Jim, Julius Caesar, Macbeth, Madame Bovary, Oedipus Rex, The Picture of Dorian Gray, Romeo and Juliet, Hamilton, The Great Gatsby, Hamlet.

Rebirth
Definition: An event forces the main character to change their ways and often become a better individual.

Examples: Pride and Prejudice, The Frog Prince, Beauty and the Beast, The Snow Queen, A Christmas Carol, The Secret Garden, Peer Gynt, Groundhog Day.

The Rule of Three

The third event in a series of events becomes "the final trigger for something important to happen." This pattern appears in childhood stories, like Goldilocks and the Three Bears, Cinderella, and Little Red Riding Hood.

In adult stories, the Rule of Three conveys the gradual resolution of a process that leads to transformation. This transformation can be downwards as well as upwards.

Booker asserts that the Rule of Three is expressed in four ways:
 The simple, or cumulative three, for example, Cinderella's three visits to the ball.
 The ascending three, where each event is of more significance than the preceding, for example, the hero must win first bronze, then silver, then gold objects.
 The contrasting three, where only the third has positive value, for example, The Three Little Pigs, two of whose houses are blown down by the Big Bad Wolf.
 The final or dialectical form of three, where, as with Goldilocks and her bowls of porridge, the first is wrong in one way, the second in an opposite way, and the third is "just right".

Precursors
William Foster-Harris' The Basic Patterns of Plot sets out a theory of three basic patterns of plot.
Ronald B. Tobias set out a twenty-plot theory in his 20 Master Plots.
Georges Polti's The Thirty-Six Dramatic Situations.
 Several of these plots are similar to Joseph Campbell's work on the quest and return in The Hero with a Thousand Faces (see Hero's journey).

Reception

The Seven Basic Plots has received mixed responses from scholars and journalists.

Some have celebrated the book's audacity and breadth; for example, the author and essayist Fay Weldon wrote the following: "This is the most extraordinary, exhilarating book. It always seemed to me that 'the story' was God's way of giving meaning to crude creation. Booker now interprets the mind of God, and analyzes not just the novel – which will never to me be quite the same again – but puts the narrative of contemporary human affairs into a new perspective. If it took its author a lifetime to write, one can only feel gratitude that he did it." Beryl Bainbridge, Richard Adams, Ronald Harwood, and John Bayley also spoke positively of the work, while philosopher Roger Scruton described it as a "brilliant summary of story-telling".

Others have dismissed the book on grounds that Booker is too rigid in fitting works of art to the plot types above. For example, novelist and literary critic Adam Mars-Jones wrote, "[Booker] sets up criteria for art, and ends up condemning Rigoletto, The Cherry Orchard, Wagner, Proust, Joyce, Kafka and Lawrence—the list goes on—while praising Crocodile Dundee, E.T. and Terminator 2".  Similarly, Michiko Kakutani in The New York Times writes, "Mr. Booker evaluates works of art on the basis of how closely they adhere to the archetypes he has so laboriously described; the ones that deviate from those classic patterns are dismissed as flawed or perverse – symptoms of what has gone wrong with modern art and the modern world."

See also
 Analytical psychology
 Heroine's journey
 Monomyth
 Plot (narrative)

References

External links
 Google Books
 "Everything ever written boiled down to seven plots", review by Kasia Boddy, The Telegraph, 2004-11-21
 "Terminator 2 good, The Odyssey bad", review by Adam Mars-Jones, The Observer, 2004-11-21
 "The Plot Thins, or Are No Stories New?", review by Michiko Kakutani, The New York Times, 2005-04-15
 "Once Upon a Time", review by Denis Dutton, The Washington Post, 2005-05-08
 "The Seven Basic Plots", review by Clive Bradley, Workers' Liberty, 2005-12-25
 "What are the seven basic literary plots?", Cecil Adams, The Straight Dope, 2000-12-24
 'The "Basic" Plots in Literature', IPL2

Books about literature
Books by Christopher Booker
2004 non-fiction books